Up 2 Me (stylized as Up 2 Më) is the debut studio album by American rapper Yeat. It was released on September 10, 2021 through Interscope Records, Foundation Media, and Twizzy Rich. The album features a guest appearance from fellow rapper SeptembersRich. The album's lead single, Gët Busy, was released on September 1, 2021, nine days before the album. The album’s artwork was made by Internet Girlfriend, a popular graphic designer in the internet music scene.

Singles 
The album's lead single, "Get Busy", was released on September 1. Another song on the album, "U Could Tell", was included in the second season of the HBO series Euphoria. The instrumental for the song Turban was included in a collaborative commercial between Nike and Dick's Sporting Goods.

Critical reception

In his Washington Post piece on Yeat, Chris Richards noted that Yeat "visits nearly every corner of his lungs, throat, mouth and sinuses on 'Turban'", and that "his approach still feels avant and inventive. Rhyming in alien purrs and phantasmal coos, it's as if he's melting into his beats".

Pitchfork reviewer Alphonse Pierre claims that "Yeat's inspiration feels like it refreshingly goes beyond Whole Lotta Red" while giving the album a 6.7/10. Tivo Staff from AllMusic stated that "It's funny, weird, and infectious, like the best of Up 2 Më. Uncommon production choices and Yeat's laid-back but surprisingly off-center personality make these tracks a breath of fresh air in a commercial rap landscape where artists and songs can sometimes feel interchangeable  ".

Genius ranked "Gët Busy" 18th on their "Genius "Community's 50 Best Songs Of 2021" list. The song was also ranked 81st on Pitchforks "100 Best Songs of 2021" list and included on the publication's "38 Best Rap Songs of 2021" list.

Commercial performance
Up 2 Me charted at No. 183 on the Billboard selling 5,000 album-equivalent units, four months after it was released.

Track listing

Notes
 Any song title that contains the letter 'e' is replaced with 'ë'. For example, "U Could Tell" is stylized as "U Could Tëll". If a song contains two or more 'e's, then only the first one is replaced.
 Only the first letter of each song title is capitalized (except "Gët Busy", "Ya Ya", "Twizzy Rich" and "Swërved It"). For example, "Monëy So Big" is stylized as "Monëy so big".

Charts

Weekly charts

Year-end charts

References

2021 debut albums
Yeat albums